Seyfabad (also Romanized as Seyfābād) is a village in Qomrud Rural District, in the Central District of Qom County, Qom Province, Iran. At the 2006 census, its population was 23, in 7 families.

References 

Populated places in Qom Province